Mudar Mohammad Ayesh Badran (born 18 January 1934) is a Jordanian politician and government minister, and industrialist. He served as the 23rd Prime Minister of Jordan on three occasions from 1976 to 1979, then again from 1980 to 1984, and finally from 1989 to 1991.

Biography
Badran was born in Jerash, Jordan (then the Emirate of Transjordan, a colony of the United Kingdom) in 1934. He studied at the Damascus University in French Syria and graduated as a lawyer. Badran started his career as a young officer in the Jordanian army. Later, he served as the Director of the General Intelligence Directorate in the 1970s, during Black September. Following this troubled time, he became chief of the Hashemite Royal Court. He also served as Minister of Education.

Badran became Prime Minister of Jordan from 1976 to 1984, with a brief interruption from 1979 until 1980. He was appointed to the position again on 4 December 1989, replacing Zaid bin Shaker after his resignation. Badran's third term lasted until 1991, when Jordan once again became a democracy, and the Senate gained its legitimate powers again after two decades with no parliamentary elections. He served more than eight years as Prime Minister, which made him the second-longest serving Prime Minister of Jordan, second only to Zaid al-Rifai. He also served as foreign minister from 1976 to 1979 and as defense minister for most of the time that he was Prime Minister. Badran was a close associate of King Hussein.

In 1993, he was appointed as a member of the Senate. In 2011, he was given and honorary PhD in economics from the Hashemite University. Badran was also the target of a failed assassination attempt in Amman in February 1981 by the Syrian Defense Companies.

Personal life
Badran's younger brother, Adnan Badran is also a Jordanian politician.

Badran resides in Abdoun with his wife, Mo'mina. Together, they have two sons and three daughters. His daughter, Reem Badran, is a former deputy in the House of Representatives.

Phasing out of political life, Badran headed to the private sector where he started a steel company; Jordan Steel P.L.C. since 1993, later on becoming Jordan's leading steel manufacturer.

See also
 List of prime ministers of Jordan

References

External links

1934 births
Living people
Damascus University alumni
People from Jerash
Prime Ministers of Jordan
Education ministers of Jordan
Defence ministers of Jordan
Foreign ministers of Jordan
Jordanian military personnel
Members of the Senate of Jordan
Jordanian expatriates in Syria